This is the discography of rock and roll musician Chuck Berry.

Albums

Studio albums

Live albums
{| class="wikitable plainrowheaders" style="text-align:center;"
! scope="col" rowspan="2" | Title
! scope="col" rowspan="2" | Album details
! colspan="3" scope="col" | Peak chart positions
! scope="col" rowspan="2" | Certifications
|-
! style="width:3em;font-size:85%" | US
! style="width:3em;font-size:85%" | CAN
! style="width:3em;font-size:85%" | UK
|-
! scope="row" |Chuck Berry on Stage
|
Released: August 1963
Label: Chess
Format: LP
|29
|—
|6
|
|-
! scope="row" |Live at the Fillmore Auditorium 
|
Released: September 1967
Label: Mercury
Format: LP
|—
|—
|—
|
|-
! scope="row" |The London Chuck Berry Sessions
|
Released: October 1972
Label: Chess (CH-60020)
Format: stereo LP
|8
|6
|—
|
|-
! scope="row" |Chuck Berry Live in Concert 
|
Released: 1978
Label: Magnum
|—
|—
|—
|
|-
! scope="row" |Alive and Rockin''' 
|
Released: 1981
Label: W.A.A.
|—
|—
|—
|
|-
! scope="row" |Toronto Rock 'n' Roll Revival 1969 Vol. II|
Released: 1982
Label: Accord
|—
|—
|—
|
|-
! scope="row" |Toronto Rock 'n' Roll Revival 1969 Vol. III|
Released: 1982
Label: Accord
|—
|—
|—
|
|-
! scope="row" |Live! 
|
Released: 1994
Label: Columbia River
|—
|—
|—
|
|-
! scope="row" |Live on Stage|
Released: 2000
Label: Magnum
|—
|—
|—
|
|-
! scope="row" |Chuck Berry – In Concert|
Released: 2002
Label: Magnum
|—
|—
|—
|
|-
! scope="row" |Rockin' Rollin' New Year's Eve|
Released: 2020
Label: Liberation Hall
Format: LP
|—
|—
|—
|
|-
| colspan="6" |
|-
|}

Compilation albums
{| class="wikitable plainrowheaders" style="text-align:center;"
! scope="col" rowspan="2" | Title
! scope="col" rowspan="2" | Album details
! colspan="4" scope="col" | Peak chart positions
! scope="col" rowspan="2" | Certifications
|-
! style="width:3em;font-size:85%" | US
! style="width:3em;font-size:85%" | FRA
! style="width:3em;font-size:85%" | SWI
! style="width:3em;font-size:85%" | UK
|-
! scope="row" | Chuck Berry Twist|
Released: February 1962
Label: Chess (LP-1465)
Format: LP
|—
|—
|—
|12
|
|-
! scope="row" | More Chuck Berry|
Released: December 1963
Label: Pye International (NPL 28028)
Format: LP
|—
|—
|—
|9
|
|-
! scope="row" | Chuck Berry's Greatest Hits|
Released: April 1964
Label: Chess (LP-1485)
Format: LP
|34
|—
|—
|—
|
|-
! scope="row" | The Latest and the Greatest|
Released: May 1964 (UK)
Label: Pye International (NPL 28031)
Format: LP
|—
|—
|—
|8
|
|-
! scope="row" | You Never Can Tell|
Released: September 1964 (UK)
Label: Pye International (NPL 29039)
Format: LP
|—
|—
|—
|18
|
|-
! scope="row" | Chuck Berry's Golden Decade|
Released: 1967
Label: Chess (2CH-1514)
Format: Double LP
|72
|—
|—
|—
|
|-
! scope="row" | Chuck Berry's Golden Decade, Vol. 2|
Released: February 1973
Label: Chess (2CH-60023)
Format: Double LP
|110
|—
|—
|—
|
|-
! scope="row" | Chuck Berry's Golden Decade, Vol. 3|
Released: May 1974
Label: Chess (2CH-60028)
Format: Double LP
|—
|—
|—
|—
|
|-
! scope="row" | Motorvatin'|
Released: 1976 (Europe)
Label: Chess (9288 690)
Format: LP
|—
|—
|—
|7
|
|-
! scope="row" | The Great Twenty-Eight|
Released: 1982
Label: Chess (2CH-8201)
Format: Double LP (mono)
|—
|—
|—
|—
|
|-
! scope="row" | Motive Series|
Released: 1982
Label: Mercury (6463129)
Format: LP
|—
|—
|—
|—
|
|-
! scope="row" | Chess Masters|
Released: March 1983
Label: Chess (CXMP 2011)
Format: LP
|—
|—
|—
|—
|
|-
! scope="row" | Rock 'n' Roll Rarities|
Released: March 1986
Label: Chess (2CH-92521)
Format: Double LP
|—
|—
|—
|—
|
|-
! scope="row" | More Rock 'n' Roll Rarities|
Released: August 1986
Label: Chess (CH-9190)
Format: LP, CD, Cassette
|—
|—
|—
|—
|
|-
! scope="row" | The Best of the Best of Chuck Berry|
Released: 1987/1994
Label: Gusto/Hollywood/IMG
Format: LP, CD, Cassette
|—
|—
|—
|—
|
|-
! scope="row" | The Chess Box|
Released: 1988
Label: Chess (CHD3-80001)
Format: CD
|—
|—
|—
|—
|
|-
! scope="row" | Missing Berries: Rarities, Vol. 3|
Released: June 1990
Label: Chess (CHC/D-9318)
Format: Cassette, CD
|—
|—
|—
|—
|
|-
! scope="row" | The Collection|
Released: August 26, 1991
Label: MCA (MCAC-17751)
Format: Cassette
|—
|—
|—
|—
|
|-
! scope="row" | 36 All-Time Greatest Hits|
Released: 1996
Label: Universal Distribution
Format: CD
|—
|—
|—
|—
|
|-
! scope="row" | Let It Rock|
Released: June 4, 1996
Label: Universal Special (MCAC/D-20931)
Format: Cassette, CD
|—
|—
|—
|—
|
|-
! scope="row" | The Best of Chuck Berry|
Released: July 26, 1996
Label: MCA (MCAD-11560)
Format: Double CD
|—
|—
|—
|116
|
BPI: Gold
|-
! scope="row" | Guitar Legends 
|
Released: February 11, 1997
Label: Universal Special (20974)
Format: Cassette, CD
|—
|—
|—
|—
|
|-
! scope="row" | His Best, Vol. 1|
Released: March 25, 1996
Label: MCA/Chess (CHD-9371)
Format: CD
|—
|—
|—
|—
|
|-
! scope="row" | His Best, Vol. 2|
Released: May 20, 1997
Label: MCA/Chess (CHD-9381)
Format: CD
|—
|—
|—
|—
|
|-
! scope="row" | The Best of Chuck Berry|
Released: September 15, 1997
Label: Universal Distribution
Format: CD
|—
|—
|—
|—
|
|-
! scope="row" | Sweet Little Rock 'n' Roller|
Released: October 14, 1997
Label: MCA/Chess (CHD-80245)
Format: CD
|—
|—
|—
|—
|
|-
! scope="row" | 20th Century Masters: The Best of Chuck Berry|
Released: March 23, 1999
Label: MCA (MCAC/D-11944)
Format: Cassette, CD
|134
|—
|—
|—
|
|-
! scope="row" | Anthology|
Released: June 27, 2000
Label: MCA/Chess (CHD-112304)
Format: CD
|—
|175
|48
|110
|
|-
! scope="row" | The Ultimate Collection|
Released: September 5, 2000
Label: Universal International (17751)
Format: CD
|—
|—
|—
|—
|
|-
! scope="row" | Blues|
Released: August 12, 2003
Label: MCA/Chess (B000053002)
Format: CD
|—
|—
|—
|—
|
|-
! scope="row" | Chuck Berry|
Released: October 28, 2003
Label: Universal International (98017)
Format: CD
|—
|—
|—
|—
|
|-
! scope="row" | The Definitive Collection|
Released: April 18, 2006
Label: Geffen-Universal 
Format: CD
|33
|—
|75
|—
|
|-
! scope="row" | Johnny B. Goode: His Complete '50s Chess Recordings|
Released: February 19, 2008
Label: Hip-O Select-Geffen-Universal 
Format: CD
|—
|—
|—
|—
|
|-
! scope="row" | You Never Can Tell: His Complete Chess Recordings 1960–1966|
Released: March 31, 2009
Label: Hip-O Select-Geffen-Universal (12465)
Format: CD
|—
|—
|—
|—
|
|-
! scope="row" | Have Mercy: His Complete Chess Recordings 1969–1974|
Released: March 23, 2010
Label: Hip-O Select-Geffen-Universal (13790)
Format: CD
|—
|—
|—
|—
|
|-
! scope="row" | Rock And Roll Music – Any Old Way You Choose It- The Complete Studio Recordings... Plus!|
Released: November 4, 2014
Label: Bear Family
Format: CD
|—
|—
|—
|—
|
|-
| colspan="6" | 
|
|}

Soundtrack albums

EPs

SinglesBillboard did not publish a separate R&B singles chart in 1964. For this year only, R&B chart positions are from Cash Box'' magazine.

Billboard Year-End performances

Notes

References

Discography
Rock music discographies
Discographies of American artists